Prince of Persia is a video game franchise.

Prince of Persia may also refer to:
 Prince of Persia (1989 video game)
 Prince of Persia (2008 video game)
 Prince of Persia: The Sands of Time (film), a 2010 film
 Prince (Prince of Persia), the protagonist of the video games and the 2010 film
Qamar al-Aqmar, known as the "Prince of Persia", the protagonist of the One Thousand and One Nights tale of "The Ebony Horse"
Prince of Persia, a territorial spirit described in the book of Daniel

See also
List of monarchs of Persia